Calothyrza is a genus of longhorn beetles of the subfamily Lamiinae, containing the following species:

 Calothyrza jardinei (White, 1858)
 Calothyrza margaritifera (Westwood, 1848)
 Calothyrza pauli (Fairmaire, 1884)
 Calothyrza sehestedti (Fabricius, 1798)

References

Phrynetini